William Henry Rorke (October 23, 1910 – August 19, 1987), known professionally as Hayden Rorke, was an American actor best known for playing Colonel Alfred E. Bellows on the 1960s American sitcom I Dream of Jeannie.

Early life
Rorke was born in Brooklyn, New York in 1910. He was the son of screen and stage actress Margaret Hayden Rorke, and he took his stage forename from her maiden name.

Rorke attended Brooklyn Preparatory School, a Jesuit school, where he served as president of the Dramatics Society and the Student Government, and was a member of the Omega Gamma Delta Fraternity. He continued his education at the American Academy of Dramatic Arts and began his stage career in the 1930s with the Hampden Theatrical Company. During World War II, he enlisted in the United States Army, where he made his film debut in the musical This Is the Army starring Ronald Reagan, for which he was uncredited as the stage manager and as a soldier in the background.

Acting career
Following the war, he left the Army and worked in small parts on Broadway, returning to Hollywood for the film Lust for Gold (1949), again uncredited. However, it was an opening, and in later films, beginning with Rope of Sand, he is listed in the credits, although he again shows up uncredited in the films Kim (1950) and The Magnificent Yankee (1950), as well as a couple of later films such as the Academy Award-winning An American in Paris (in those days, small roles were often uncredited). He played the role of crooked businessman and murderer Arne Mason in episode 90 "Word of Honor" of the television series The Lone Ranger in 1952. He also appeared in episode 125 entitled "The Perfect Crime" of that television series in 1953. He continued to make movies, taking on supporting roles in films. Rorke also went uncredited as Clark Kent's psychiatrist in the "Adventures of Superman" episode "The Face and the Voice".

In 1957, Rorke played Steve, the film agent, in the television series Mr. Adams and Eve, starring Howard Duff and Ida Lupino (then married in real life) as a fictitious acting couple residing in Beverly Hills, California.

He played several guest roles on television, including Colonel Farnsworth in the short-lived 1964 sitcom No Time for Sergeants, based on the Andy Griffith film of the same name, but starring Sammy Jackson. He also appeared in three episodes of Perry Mason between 1960 and 1963. In his first role, he played the title character, Jay Holbrook, in "The Case of the Flighty Father" and as Walter Caffrey in "The Case of the Violent Vest". Rorke also appeared in television programs such as I Love Lucy, The Twilight Zone, Thriller (where he also plays a psychologist), Peter Gunn, The Andy Griffith Show, Bonanza, Barnaby Jones, Mister Ed, Wonder Woman, The George Burns and Gracie Allen Show, The Beverly Hillbillies, and The Love Boat.

Rorke was best known for his role as Dr. Bellows, the NASA medical officer in the television sitcom I Dream of Jeannie. Bellows was constantly trying to figure out why Tony Nelson (Larry Hagman), an astronaut under Bellows' supervision, often behaves strangely, and to decipher the madcap antics, but he never figures out what is actually going on. Bellows usually winds up making himself look like a fool in front of his own superiors. Rorke's last film was reprising his role in the television reunion movie I Dream of Jeannie... Fifteen Years Later (1985).

In the early 1980s, Rorke returned to the theater, making a number of live stage appearances. In May, 1980, he starred with Joan Caulfield at the old Showboat Dinner Theatre in St. Petersburg, Florida, in The Pleasure of His Company. He also acted in Mr. Roberts in St. Louis, Missouri.

Personal life and death
Rorke's I Dream of Jeannie co-star Barbara Eden described him as a "prince" who was a good friend to all and always managed to keep up the spirits of the Jeannie cast, even in difficult circumstances.

Eden also wrote in her 2011 biography Jeannie Out of the Bottle that Rorke was "unashamedly gay," and that he lived with his partner, television director Justus Addiss (of Mister Ed, among others), for many years in Studio City, along with their menagerie of dogs, until Addiss' death on October 26, 1979.  The couple would often invite the cast over for parties.

Rorke died of multiple myeloma at his Toluca Lake home in 1987 at age 76. He was survived by two brothers.

Television
The Lone Ranger (1950) 1x35 "Bullets for Ballots"I Love Lucy (1952) 1x21 New Neighbors as Tom O'BrienThe Burns and Allen Show (1957) 7x21 "Going to Palm Springs" as a psychologistMr. Adams and Eve (1957–1958) regular cast as StevePerry Mason (1960) 3x26 "The Case of the Flighty Father" as Jay Holbrook and (1961) 4x24 "The Case of the Violent Vest" as Walter CaffreyTarget: The Corruptors! (1961) 1x11 "Silent Partner" as Smith, (1962) 1x30 License to StealThe Beverly Hillbillies (1963) 1x36 "Jethro's Friend" as WilkinsI Dream of Jeannie (1965-1970) regular cast as Dr. Alfred BellowsCannon (1975) 5x02 "The Deadly Conspiracy" as KnoxThe Love Boat (1977) 1x08 "The Understudy" as Mr. Humbertson

Partial filmography

 This Is the Army (1943) - Soldier / Stage Manager (uncredited)
 Lust for Gold (1949) - Floyd Buckley (uncredited)
 Rope of Sand (1949) - Ingram
 Sword in the Desert (1949) - Capt. Beaumont
 Kim (1950) - Major Ainsley (uncredited)
 The Magnificent Yankee (1950) - Graham (uncredited)
 Inside Straight (1951) - Carlson
 Father's Little Dividend (1951) - Dr. Andrew Nordell
 Double Crossbones (1951) - Malcolm Giles
 Francis Goes to the Races (1951) - Rogers
 The Prince Who Was a Thief (1951) - Basra
 The Law and the Lady (1951) - Tracy Collans
 An American in Paris (1951) - Tommy Baldwin (uncredited)
 When Worlds Collide (1951) - Dr. Emery Bronson
 Starlift (1951) - Chaplain
 Room for One More (1952) - The Doctor (scenes deleted)
 Wild Stallion (1952) - Maj. Cullen
 Skirts Ahoy! (1952) - Doctor
 Above and Beyond (1952) - Dr. Ramsey
 Rogue's March (1953) - Maj. Fallow
 The Story of Three Loves (1953) - Mr. Thomas Clayton Campbell, Sr. (segment "Mademoiselle") (uncredited)
 The Stars Are Singing (1953) - Congressman Nolte (uncredited)
 Confidentially Connie (1953) - Prof. Simmons
 The Girl Next Door (1953) - Henry Fields
 South Sea Woman (1953) - Prosecution Lt. Fears
 Project Moonbase (1953) - General Greene
 The Robe (1953) - Caluus - Slave Auction Bidder (uncredited)
 Lucky Me (1954) - Tommy Arthur
 Drum Beat (1954) - President Ulysses S. Grant
 The Eternal Sea (1955) - Capt. William Buracker
 All That Heaven Allows (1955) - Dr. Dan Hennessy
 Tip on a Dead Jockey (1957) - J.R. Nichols (uncredited)
 This Happy Feeling (1958) - Mr. Booth
 The Restless Years (1958) - Mr. Booth
 Stranger in My Arms (1959) - Marcus Beasley
 Pillow Talk (1959) - Mr. Conrad
 I Aim at the Stars (1960) - U.S. Army Major
 Midnight Lace (1960) - Dr. Garver
 Parrish (1961) - Tom Weldon
 Tammy Tell Me True (1961) - Joshua Welling
 Back Street (1961) - Charley Claypole
 Pocketful of Miracles (1961) - Police Captain Moore
 Spencer's Mountain (1963) - Colonel Coleman
 The Thrill of It All (1963) - Billings
 The Unsinkable Molly Brown (1964) - Malcolm Broderick
 A House Is Not a Home (1964) - Bill Cameron
 I'd Rather Be Rich (1964) - MacDougall
 Youngblood Hawke (1964) - Mr. Givney
 The Night Walker (1964) - Howard Trent
 The Barefoot Executive (1971) - Clifford
 The Moneychangers (1976, TV Mini-Series) - Lewis Dorsey
 I Dream of Jeannie... Fifteen Years Later'' (1985, TV Movie) - Dr. Alfred Bellows

Notes

References

External links
 
 
 

1910 births
1987 deaths
Male actors from New York City
American male film actors
American male television actors
Burials at Holy Cross Cemetery, Culver City
Deaths from multiple myeloma
American Academy of Dramatic Arts alumni
American gay actors
Deaths from cancer in California
United States Army personnel of World War II
LGBT people from New York (state)
20th-century American male actors
People from Brooklyn
Military personnel from New York City
Brooklyn Preparatory School alumni
20th-century American LGBT people